Felix-Adrian Körber (born 8 February 1993) is a German footballer who plays as a goalkeeper for SSV Dillingen, where he is also the joint-manager.

Career
Körber made his professional debut for 1. FC Heidenheim in the 3. Liga on 10 May 2014, coming on as a substitute in the 90th minute for Erol Sabanov in the 2–0 home win against SpVgg Unterhaching.

References

External links
 Profile at DFB.de
 Profile at kicker.de

1993 births
Living people
German footballers
Association football goalkeepers
1. FC Heidenheim players
SSV Ulm 1846 players
2. Bundesliga players
3. Liga players
German football managers